Theresa Abed is an American politician from Michigan. Abed was a Democratic member of the Michigan House of Representatives, serving during the 2013–2014 session.

Education 
Abed earned a bachelor's degree and a master's degree in social work from Wayne State University.

Career 
Abed has a background as a social worker. In 2006, Abed served as a commissioner of Eaton County, Michigan, until 2010.

On November 6, 2012, Abed won the election and became a Democratic member of Michigan House of Representatives for District 71. Abed defeated Deb Shaughnessy with 53.43% of the votes.

Abed lost her bid for re-election in 2014 to Republican Tom Barrett. In 2016 Abed unsuccessfully ran against Barrett for the 71st seat again.

References

External links
 
 Biography at Ballotpedia
 Legislative website
 Twitter account

Year of birth missing (living people)
Living people
Democratic Party members of the Michigan House of Representatives
Michigan Democrats
Politicians from Detroit
Wayne State University alumni
Women state legislators in Michigan
21st-century American women politicians
21st-century American politicians